Rudolf Oslansky (23 May 1931 – 4 October 2012) was an Austrian international footballer.

References

External links

1931 births
2012 deaths
Austrian footballers
Association football midfielders
Austria international footballers
Wiener Sport-Club players
Place of birth missing